Tomata Dam is a dam in the Okayama Prefecture, Japan, completed in 2004.

All shrines, trees, and houses were moved before the valley was flooded. The town hall was also moved.

References 

Dams in Okayama Prefecture
Dams completed in 2004